Russell Lant Carpenter (December 17, 1816 – 1892), a Unitarian minister who carried on the works of his father, Dr. Lant Carpenter and wrote his biography.  He was a brother of the social reformer Mary Carpenter.

Carpenter was born in 1816 in Kidderminster, Worcester, England and was christened in Devonshire, England. He died in 1892.

Books
  Memoirs of the Life of Rev. Lant Carpenter, LL.D., by Carpenter, Russell Lant, B.A. (1842) Published:  Green, Newgate Street, London, England and Philip and Evans, Calre Street, Bristol, England. Online at:  GoogleBooks.
  Memoir of the Rev. Lant Carpenter, LL.D. by Carpenter, Russell Lant, B.A. (1875) and abridged by his sister, Mary Carpenter. Published by: E. T. Whitfield, 178 Strand, W. C., London, England. Printed by:  Arrowsmith Printer, Quay Street, Bristol, England.

References

1816 births
1892 deaths
People from Kidderminster
English Unitarian ministers
19th-century English clergy